Derek Scott may refer to:

 Derek Scott (athlete) (born 1985), American distance runner and coach
 Derek Scott (cricketer) (born 1964), New Zealand cricketer
 Derek Scott (curler), Scottish curler
 Derek Scott (footballer) (born 1958), English former professional footballer
 Derek Scott (music director) (1921–2006), English musical director and composer
 Derek Scott Jr., American stock car racing driver